Margaret McNair O’Neal was a Euro-American woman who lived in rural Orange County, North Carolina, who was interviewed by William O. Forster on October 4, 1938 for the Federal Writers' Project. She married Ed O’Neal and together they had five boys, but raised nine children until the time of Ed's death in 1938.

Biography 
Margaret McNair O’Neal, born in 1884 in a house on U.S. Highway 15 in Orange County near the Durham County line, was the youngest of nine children and the only one to live with her parents after her birth. She dropped out of school after ninth grade to plow fields and pick crops once her parents became old. She married widower Ed O’Neal, whom she met at a neighbor's party and they quickly began dating. They eloped in 1900, and bought a 73-acre farm one-half a mile south of Chapel Hill off of US Highway No. 15.

They had five kids together, and raised Ed's four children from his previous marriage as well, filling their house with eleven in all. Margaret was a member of the United Church in Chapel Hill, but her children were not devout, although they all attended the Baptist Sunday School irregularly. Ed died in August 1938 due to diabetes and angina pectoris which he came down with in 1936. A pension of about $10.00 a month was sent to the family after Ed's death. The family was in dire straits by 1938, as were many women in the time period, and was going to have to sell or sharecrop parts of the farm if the children could not get married or jobs. The O’Neal's medical costs for birthing, Ed's hospital visits, and general practitioner visits were factors of the financial instability that Margaret O’Neal and her children faced during the Great Depression.

Social Context

Finances

Medical Costs
Medical costs were a significant issue brought up by Margaret O’Neal in the interview for the Federal Writers' Project. The family had to take much of their savings and spend them on doctor's visits for birthing costs, a nurse for a child, and even for visiting Duke University Hospital. For each of the five boys that Margaret and Ed had together, they had to bring in a doctor for $30 a visit, and for the last child had to hire a nurse for three weeks at a total expense of $45. As for Ed, he had to visit the Duke University Hospital twice, the first time being diagnosed with diabetes, and the second time with angina pectoris.

Dependence
As Margaret became older, she began to realize she was going to have to rely on her children, to support her financially. Common of the Great Depression era, women struggled to be financially independent and as well had to get recommendations from others to even receive a pension. The family received no financial aid from the government's New Deal Programs, like many other families in larger cities to offset the medical bills, and the only extra help they received was $10 a month from Ed's pension, and they too had to apply and prove that they family warranted such aid.

New Deal Programs
New Deal programs for agriculture came about as quickly as 1933, and brought benefits of land consolidation, mechanization, and introducing new crop strands. On March 16, 1933 President Roosevelt signed the Agricultural Adjustment Act which created the Agricultural Adjustment Administration (AAA), an independent New Deal program that reported directly to the President.

Sharecropping
The O'Neal family had three of their twenty cultivated acres of farm being worked by a black sharecropper by 1938. Sharecropping became a popular type of living in the 1930s, with 30% of the United States' workforce being sharecroppers of many ethnicities. 45% of Southern White farmers were sharecroppers and 77% of Southern Black farmers were sharecroppers by 1935.

Federal Writers' Project 
The window into Margaret O’Neal's life during the interview was very small and mentioned little or said nothing about her childhood, siblings or family, her nine years of schooling, and lastly the crops that the McNair's or the O’Neal's grew and cultivated despite that being a constant throughout her whole life. With only one interview being conducted by the Federal Writer's Project, only a small bit of information about her life was gathered, bringing to question how effective the Federal Writers' Project was in completing the goal of showing how life was for many people during the Great Depression and New Deal era, as more questions become raised from the blind spots within each interview.

There also was a heavy focus on the time around the interview was taken rather than dwelling on the past to create a complete history. "What struck me most about the stories of these women was a relative absence of any of this type of sentiment about their lives, both as girls growing up looking toward the future, and as older women reflecting back on their hard lives.” Forster goes into detail about the O’Neal's house and the land that they live off of. In the few months before the interview, Margaret recounts how Ed died to sickness, as well as how her boys lost work and have had trouble finding jobs to the present. As Margaret O’Neal looks into the future months, she contemplates moving into town, to buy house and rent rooms out for income. She also expresses a deep concern for her children, as soon they will need to start supporting her financially. Margaret's solution is that the girls will need find men to marry and take care of them, while the boys need to get jobs or find jobs that will pay better.

Notes

People from Orange County, North Carolina
1884 births
Year of death missing